Henry Winkelmann (1860–1931) was a notable New Zealand photographer. Winkelmann's photographs covered a wide range of topics, but he is best known for his yachting photographs.

Early years
Henry Winkelmann was born in Bradford, Yorkshire, England on 26 September 1860, one of eight children of Peter Winkelmann a stuff and yarn merchant and Louise Schüller. He spent parts of his childhood in nearby Gomersal, Bramley and Manningham.

His older brother, Charles, immigrated to New Zealand in 1875, where he became first a schoolteacher then a chemist and later a photographer.

In Henry Winkelmann immigrated to New Zealand arriving at Port Chalmers in October 1878 on the sailing ship Calypso.
As his father had died in 1877, his mother, Louise, and five sisters followed him to New Zealand in the mid 1880s.

Jarvis Island
By 1881 he was living in Auckland and unemployed.  He and Harold Willey Hudson, a fellow boarder at the place he was staying were hired to claim uninhabited Jarvis Island near the equator (valued for its guano), for Thomas Henderson junior partner of Henderson and MacFarlane. Henderson would provide passage and provisions plus a salary, payable upon return of £2 10s for every month spent on the island. They were to stay a minimum of three months, a maximum of five; and they were to resist any attempts at dispossession.

They left Auckland aboard the schooner Sunbeam on 8 June 1881. In order to prevent other Auckland business rivals knowing what they were doing, their advertised destination was given as the Kingsmill (Gilbert) Islands. The schooner reached Jarvis Island on 2 August 1881 which dropped them off in August 1881, intending to return at the end of the three-month period necessary to validate their claim.  The island was small, consisted mostly of white coral and guano, had no trees and was home to three graves and a number of rundown buildings built by the American Guano Company.  
They explored the island and removed a foreign flag, finding evidence of a recent caretaker who had left the island because of sickness. A notice stated he would return. Winkelmann and Hudson made their own declaration, signed it and hoisted the British flag.

However, when the ship failed to return, the men struggled to survive. They built a still, caught turtles and preserved and ate birds' eggs. They were finally rescued on 23 March 1882 by a ship sent by Henderson,  nearly eight months after their arrival on the island.
Before leaving the island, the ship tried to load up with guano, but she was unable to safely anchor. A man named Squire Flockton was left behind to retain ownership, together with Hudson's revolver. Several months later, deranged and full of gin, he shot and killed himself.
 
Upon their return to Auckland, Henderson paid them their wages and not a penny more.

Bank clerk
In 1882 Winkelmann joined the Bank of New Zealand. He worked in branches in New Zealand and Fiji, supplementing his income by teaching the zither and playing in concerts. 
In 1889 he was transferred to the bank's Sydney branch, returning to Auckland in 1891.

Photography
In April 1892 Winkelmann purchased a Lancaster Instantograph camera and soon recognising its commercial potential began to supplement his earnings as bank clerk with photography. He created a darkroom in his mother's house in Dock Street (now Huia Street), Devonport. He continued to work at the Bank of New Zealand, which by 1896 had relocated him to Blenheim. He remained there until 1897 when after his mother's death he left the bank and returned to Auckland.
Back in Auckland he began a customs and indent agency on Queen Street wharf, Auckland working for the steamer SS Kawau. He also sold insurance for the Magdeburg Insurance Company, and acted as a debt collector. All the time he continued to supplement this income with photography.
In July 1898 Winkelmann was appointed secretary of the Coastal Steamship Company.
He travelled throughout New Zealand, recording sights and scenes through the camera lens. As a result, Winkelmann built up an impressive collection of photographs of many subjects.

In 1899 Winkelmann became a member of the Auckland Yacht Club (later the Royal New Zealand Yacht Club). By 1893 his interests in photography and yachting began converging as he was becoming well known for his yachting images. He would often climb the masts while sailing, to take aerial pictures. 
To assist him in taking better images he purchased a Thornton-Pickard Ruby No.4 half-plate camera and a half plate enlarging lantern from Ross of London.

His photographs were by this time being published in New Zealand periodicals and overseas publications, most notably the Auckland Weekly News, due to his friendship with Henry, Robert and Charles Horton, who had an interest in the publication.

In 1895 he won the New Zealand Graphic photography competition.

In August 1901 Winkelmann set up a photographic studio at 316 Victoria Arcade, at the corner of Shortland and Queen Streets.

In 1903 he accompanied a New Zealand Parliamentary visit to New Zealand's Pacific islands territories. 
In 1906 he exhibited at the Christchurch International Exhibition.

He was photographer on the 1908 scientific expedition on the Union Steamship ship Taviuni to view the solar eclipse at Flint Island in 1907-1908. This lead him to also accompanying the 1910 scientific expedition on the Talune to the Cook and Society islands.

In 1908 he won the Auckland Weekly News photography competition. 
In 1915 he won the grand prix award at the Panama–Pacific International Exposition in San Francisco.

Decline
In late 1913 Winkelmann purchased a farm at Kaukapakapa and he spent much of World War I there, a period that saw him retreat from most social life except for the yachting race days. Winkelmann settled in Swanson in 1917, establishing an orchard and fowl house. By 1927 he had accumulated 100 acres of land at Swanson. While living in Swanson, Winkelmann was asked to take family portraits of a local family, and was inspired to teach the family's son, Olaf Petersen, how to use a camera. Petersen later became a well-regarded nature photographer in his own right.

Retirement
Upon his retirement in 1928 Winkelmann sold his collection of Auckland city negatives to the Auckland Public Library. He spent his retirement in Swanson and Ponsonby. He died at Mount Eden on 5 July 1931.

In his will he left his collection of photographs and Glass-plate negatives were left to the Auckland War Memorial Museum. In 1972 his nephew Eric Fox gifted to the Auckland Museum more of Winkelmann's negatives, a large number of lantern slides, two photo albums, as well as a large number of original prints.

Personal life
Winkelmann never married. For a few years he shared a property on Great Barrier Island with a fellow Auckland Bank Clerk called Richard Harrington. Among Winkelmanns photographs are of him and friends bathing together in the hot pools on Great barrier Island, sharing a bed, and kissing. Winkelmann also captured photographs of well-known cruising spots in Auckland.  

Winkelmann was a member of the Canterbury Freehold Land Association, the Victoria Cruising Club, Auckland Yacht Club, the New Zealand Power Boat Association the Sydney Mechanics' School of Arts and the Auckland Savage Club.

Gallery

References

Bibliography

External links
Auckland Libraries: Henry Winkelmann
Real Gold, Treasures of Auckland City Libraries - Henry Winkelmann
Works of Winkelmann are held in the collection of the Auckland War Memorial Museum Tāmaki Paenga Hira

1860 births
1931 deaths
New Zealand photographers
English emigrants to New Zealand
People from Swanson
Photographers from Auckland